Dinara (or ) is a popular Kazakh feminine given name, which means "expensive".

Given name 
Dinara Safina (born 1986), Russian tennis player
Dinara Kulibaeva (born 1967), Kazakh billionaire heiress, businesswoman
Dinara Drukarova (born 1976), Russian actress
Dinara Saduakassova (born 1996), Kazakh chess player

References

Turkish feminine given names
Turkic feminine given names